Asheer Akhtar (born 14 December 1994) is an Indian professional footballer who plays as a defender for Sreenidi Deccan in the I-League.

Career
Born in Kamptee, a city based in the Nagpur district of Maharashtra, Akhtar started his career with the academy of I-League side Pune. After his time with Pune, Akhtar signed with I-League 2nd Division side Lonestar Kashmir and played the 2015–16 season with the club. When the 2nd Division concluded, Akhtar went on to represent Jammu and Kashmir in the Santosh Trophy. However, once the Santosh Trophy had ended, Akhtar moved again to Salgaocar of the Goa Professional League. During his stint with Salgaocar, Akhtar helped the side win the 2016–17 season of the Goa Professional League, thus earning his first major professional honour.

After the Goa Professional League finished, Akhtar signed with Mumbai of the I-League on 1 January 2017. Then, on 22 January 2017, he made his professional footballing debut for Mumbai in the I-League against Aizawl. He started and played 69 minutes as Mumbai lost 1–0.

International
In 2007, Akhtar was part of the India under-13 football team for the Asian U13 Football Festival.

Career statistics

Club

Honours

Club
Salgaocar
Goa Professional League: 2016–17

References

1994 births
Living people
Footballers from Nagpur
Indian footballers
Pune FC players
East Bengal Club players
Lonestar Kashmir F.C. players
Salgaocar FC players
Mumbai FC players
Association football defenders
I-League 2nd Division players
Goa Professional League players
I-League players
Mohammedan SC (Kolkata) players
Sreenidi Deccan FC players